William Henry Koontz (July 15, 1830 – July 4, 1911) was a Republican member of the U.S. House of Representatives from Pennsylvania.

Life and career
Koontz was born in Somerset, Pennsylvania.  He completed preparatory studies, studied law, was admitted to the bar in 1851 and commenced practice in Somerset.  He was district attorney for Somerset County, Pennsylvania, from 1853 to 1856.  He was a delegate to the 1860 Republican National Convention.  He served as prothonotary and clerk of the county court from 1861 to 1868.

He successfully contested as a Republican the election of Alexander H. Coffroth to the Thirty-ninth Congress.  He was reelected to the Fortieth Congress.  He was not a candidate for renomination in 1868.  He resumed the practice of law at Somerset and served as counsel for the Baltimore & Ohio Railroad Co.  He was a member of the Pennsylvania House of Representatives from 1899 to 1902.  He died in Somerset in 1911.  Interment in Union Cemetery.

Sources

The Political Graveyard

Republican Party members of the Pennsylvania House of Representatives
Pennsylvania lawyers
Pennsylvania prothonotaries
Baltimore and Ohio Railroad people
1830 births
1911 deaths
Republican Party members of the United States House of Representatives from Pennsylvania
19th-century American politicians
19th-century American lawyers